The term trachy, plural trachea (τραχέα), meaning "rough" or "uneven", was used to describe the cup-shaped (incorrectly often called "scyphate") Byzantine coins struck in the 11th–14th centuries. The term was properly applied to coins of electrum, billon, or copper, and not to the gold hyperpyra.

References

Sources
 

Coins of the Byzantine Empire
Numismatic terminology